Universiti Kuala Lumpur Hockey Club, commonly known as UniKL HC or UniKL is a Malaysian field hockey club based in Kuala Lumpur. It plays in the Malaysia Hockey League.

Players

Current squad

Honours

Malaysia Hockey League: 1
 Winners (2): 2019, 2020

 Malaysia Junior Hockey League overall titles
 Winners (1): 2009-10

References

Malaysian field hockey clubs
University of Kuala Lumpur